2-graph may refer to one of the following:
Two-graph, a graph-like combinatorial structure
2-regular graph, in graph theory